Nature, in the broadest sense, is the natural, physical, or material world or universe.

Nature may also refer to:

Specialized perspectives
 Nature (philosophy), in philosophy 
 Nature (Christianity), in Christian theology
 Natural environment, the ecological sphere of life on Earth

Companies
Springer Nature, a German-British academic publishing company

Arts and media

Music
 Nature (group), a K-Pop girl group formed in 2018
 Nature (rapper), Jermain Baxter (born 1972), American rapper
 Nature (The Mutton Birds album), 1995
 Nature (Paul Kelly album), 2018
 Nature: The Essence Part Three, an album by Ahmad Jamal, 1998
 "Nature" (song), by the Fourmyula, 1969; covered by the Mutton Birds, 1992
 "Nature", a song by Lu Han, 2019

Periodicals and literature
 Nature (journal), a British weekly scientific journal published since 1869
 La Nature, an 1873–1972 French magazine aimed at the popularization of science
 Nature Magazine, a 1923–1959 magazine published by the American Nature Association
 "Nature" (essay), an 1836 essay and collection of essays by Ralph Waldo Emerson
 "Nature", one of the essays in Mill's 1874 book Three Essays on Religion
 "Nature" (Tobler essay), a 1783 essay by Georg Christoph Tobler

Radio and television
 Nature (radio programme), a British wildlife and environmental programme 
 Nature (TV program), an American wildlife documentary series since 1982

Other uses
 Nature, another name for the wine grape Gewürztraminer

See also
 Mother Nature, the personification of nature as a maternal figure
 
 
 Natural (disambiguation)
 Naturalism (disambiguation)